Claus Larsen may refer to:
Claus Bo Larsen (born 1965), Danish football referee
Claus Bjørn Larsen (born 1963), Danish press photographer
Claus Larsen (born 1967), founder of Danish industrial acts Leæther Strip and Klutæ
Claus Larsen (footballer)